The House Select Committee on the Climate Crisis was a select committee established in the 116th United States Congress in 2019 when Democrats regained the majority of the United States House of Representatives. The chair is Congresswoman Kathy Castor of Florida. The committee has no mandate or subpoena power to compel witnesses to testify. 

Its predecessor was the United States House Select Committee on Energy Independence and Global Warming, which existed from 2007 to 2011, and was not renewed when the Republicans gained control of the House for the 112th Congress.

Nancy Pelosi, in her then-role as House Minority Leader, called for the Select Committee a week prior to Election Day 2018, telling the New York Times she wanted it to "'prepare the way with evidence' for energy conservation and other climate change mitigation legislation ... Pelosi said it was clearly still needed to educate the public about the impact of more frequent extreme weather events." In November and December of 2018, youth climate activists with the Sunrise Movement pushed House Democrats to form a select committee with the mandate to draft "Green New Deal" legislation, working with incoming freshman Rep. Alexandria Ocasio-Cortez, who proposed language for the committee's authorization. The activists staged a series of sit-ins in the offices of Nancy Pelosi, Steny Hoyer, and Jim McGovern, the incoming Speaker, Majority Leader, and Rules Committee chair. About two dozen Democratic members of Congress supported their proposal, but the incoming chairs of the Energy & Commerce and Natural Resources Committees, Reps. Frank Pallone and Raúl Grijalva, opposed it.

The committee held its first field hearing on August 1, 2019, at the University of Colorado at Boulder, Colorado. The witnesses started with Colorado Governor Jared Polis, followed by a panel that included the mayors of Boulder and Fort Collins, an expert in rural agricultural energy issues from Colorado State University, a representative of the oil and gas industry, and the director of the Boulder university's chief sustainability officer.

Following the November 2022 elections, the Republican Party obtained a majority in the House of Representatives. Garret Graves, the committee's ranking Republican, expressed an intent to end the committee. On December 14, 2022, the committee released its final report. The committee ceased to exist at the beginning of the 118th Congress on January 3, 2023.

Historical committee rosters

116th Congress

117th Congress

See also
 Climate change mitigation
 Climate change policy of the United States
 Climate crisis
 Effects of global warming
 Efficient energy use
 Global warming
 Energy resilience
 U.S. Climate Change Science Program

Notes

References

External links 
 Archived version of now-defunct official website

Climate Crisis
Congressional committee
Climate Crisis
Climate Crisis